The 1894 Arkansas Industrial Cardinals football team represented the University of Arkansas during the 1894 college football season. On November 29, 1894 (Thanksgiving Day), and after playing two games in October against Fort Smith High School, Arkansas Industrial played its first inter-collegiate football game against Texas Longhorns of the University of Texas.  The game was played in Austin, Texas, before a crowd of 1,500 persons.  Texas easily defeated Arkansas by a 54 to 0 score.  The starting lineup in the Texas game was: H. D. Moore (right end); Campbell (right tackle); Braswell (right guard); James (center rush); Rogers (left guard); Kobel (left tackle); Mook (left end); Lindsay (quarterback); McDaniel (right halfback); Hayden (left halfback); and Ward (fullback).  Professor John C. Futrall was the team's 21-year-old "manager". At the beginning of his tenure, Futrall was a recent graduate of the school. He later served as the university's president for 25 years from 1894 until his death in 1939.

Schedule

References

Arkansas
Arkansas Razorbacks football seasons
Arkansas Industrial Cardinals football